Charles Lumley Hill (1840 – 28 October 1909) was a pastoralist, businessman and politician in Queensland, Australia. He was a Member of the Queensland Legislative Assembly.

Early life
Hill was born in 1840 at Tickhill Castle, Yorkshire, England, the son of Colonel Charles John Hill and his wife Lady Frances Charlotte Arabella (née Lumley).

Politics
Hill was elected to the Queensland Legislative Assembly in the electoral district of Gregory on 14 November 1878 at the 1878 colonial election. He resigned from the seat on 20 February 1882, having delayed until a suitable successor (Thomas McWhannell) was found. Thomas McWhannell won the resulting by-election on 21 March 1882.

In the 1883 election, Lumley Hill contested Cook (then a 2-member electorate) but was unsuccessful, being defeated by Frederick Cooper and John Hamilton. However, allegations of "ballot stuffing" surfaced, alleging there were too many votes cast at the California Creek polling station given the number of electors and the unsuccessful candidates, Hill and Thomas Campbell petitioned to overturn the ballot. In December 1883, arrests were made in connection with the ballot stuffing. On 4 March 1884, the Elections and Qualifications Committee determined that Frederick Cooper should not be elected and that Thomas Campbell should be elected instead. On 4 August 1885, Thomas Campbell resigned after having been declared insolvent. Hill won the resulting by-election on 16 September 1885.

Hill held Cook until 26 May 1888 when he did not contest Cook in the 1888 election as he had announced his retirement from politics. However, he then decided to contest the election in Port Curtis, but was unsuccessful.

Hill contested Stanley in the 1902 election but was not successful.

Later life

On 24 July 1901, Hill married Edith Maud Taylor (née Harris), the widow of George Condamine Taylor at All Saints Anglican Church in Wickham Terrace, Brisbane. His wife was very well-connected politically, being the daughter of George Harris (a Member of the Queensland Legislative Council), the niece of George Thorn (a Queensland Premier) and the sister-in-law of Richard Gardiner Casey (a Member of the Queensland Legislative Assembly). She inherited the Bellevue Homestead near Esk from her first husband.

Hill died on 28 October 1909 at the Bellevue Homestead after a short illness. His body was brought by train to Roma Street railway station from where his funeral left for the Toowong Cemetery on 29 October 1909.

See also
 Members of the Queensland Legislative Assembly, 1878–1883; 1883–1888

References

External links
 

Members of the Queensland Legislative Assembly
1840 births
1909 deaths
Australian pastoralists
People from Tickhill
English emigrants to Australia
Burials at Toowong Cemetery
19th-century Australian politicians
19th-century Australian businesspeople